The Ogarshikha is a river in Perm Krai of Russia. It is a left tributary of the Bolshaya Motovilikha. It flows over the eastern part of Perm.

References 

Perm, Russia
Rivers of Perm Krai
Tributaries of the Kama